The 2013 BB&T Atlanta Open was a professional tennis tournament played on hard courts. It was the 26th edition of the tournament, which was part of the 2013 ATP World Tour. It took place at Atlantic Station in Atlanta, United States between 20 and 28 July 2013. It was the men's first event of the 2013 US Open Series.

Singles main-draw entrants

Seeds 

 1 Rankings are as of July 15, 2013

Other entrants 
The following players received wildcards into the singles main draw:
  Christian Harrison
  Denis Kudla
  Rhyne Williams

The following player received entry as a special exempt:
  Ivo Karlović

The following players received entry from the qualifying draw:
  Matthew Ebden
  Kevin King
  Tim Smyczek
  Mischa Zverev

Withdrawals 
Before the tournament
  Radek Štěpánek

Retirements
  Ivo Karlović (illness)
  Michael Russell (illness)

Doubles main-draw entrants

Seeds 

 Rankings are as of July 15, 2013

Other entrants 
The following pairs received wildcards into the doubles main draw:
  Christian Harrison /  Ryan Harrison
  Kevin King /  Juan Carlos Spir

Withdrawals 
During the tournament
  Michael Russell (illness)

Finals

Singles 

  John Isner defeated  Kevin Anderson, 6–7(3–7), 7–6(7–2), 7–6(7–2).

Doubles 

  Édouard Roger-Vasselin /  Igor Sijsling defeated  Colin Fleming /  Jonathan Marray, 7–6(8–6), 6–3

References

External links 
 

BBandT Atlanta Open
Atlanta Open (tennis)
July 2013 sports events in the United States
2013 in sports in Georgia (U.S. state)
2013 in Atlanta